Willie Fisher may refer to:

 William Fisher (boxer) (1940–2018), Scottish boxer
 Willie Fisher (footballer) (1873–1910), Scottish footballer